Saint-Médard-d'Excideuil (Limousin: Sent Medard d'Eissiduelh) is a commune in the Dordogne department in Nouvelle-Aquitaine in southwestern France.

History
In 1792, the commune of Gandumas merged with Saint-Médard-d'Excideuil.

Population

See also
Communes of the Dordogne department

References

Communes of Dordogne
Arrondissement of Périgueux